Franz Ningel (born 18 October 1936 in Frankfurt am Main, Hessen) is a former German pair skater and roller skater.

Ningel became World and European champion as a single roller figure skater in 1956 and 1957. He also won the German roller figure skating pair championships with Marika Kilius from 1955 to 1957.

In pairs figure skating, Kilius / Ningel became the 1957 World silver and 1956 World bronze medalists, three-time (1955–195) European bronze medalists, and three-time German national champions.

With his wife Margret Göbl, Ningel is the 1962 World bronze medalist, a three-time (1960–1962) European medalist, and a three-time (1960–1962) German national champion. The pair also finished fifth at the 1960 Winter Olympics in Squaw Valley.

Competitive highlights

Pairs figure skating with Göbl

Pairs figure skating with Kilius

References
 Eissport Magazin, 9 November 2006

1936 births
German male pair skaters
Olympic figure skaters of the United Team of Germany
Figure skaters at the 1956 Winter Olympics
Figure skaters at the 1960 Winter Olympics
Living people
World Figure Skating Championships medalists
European Figure Skating Championships medalists
Sportspeople from Frankfurt